Arthur Holt may refer to:

 Arthur Holt (politician) (1914–1995), British Liberal Party politician and MP
 Arthur Holt (sportsman) (1911–1994), English cricketer for Hampshire, who also played football with Southampton
 Arthur Holt (1921–1996), inventor of the Fisher Price Corn Popper toy